Carlo Setari (died 1486) was a Roman Catholic prelate who served as the Bishop of Isernia (1470–1486).

Biography
On 12 Jan 1470, Carlo Setari was appointed Bishop of Isernia by  Pope Paul II.
On 3 Jun 1470, he was consecrated bishop by Nicolas Solimele, Bishop of Venosa, with Meolo de Mascabruni, Bishop of Muro Lucano, and Giovanni Geraldini, Bishop of Catanzaro, serving as co-consecrators. 
He served as Bishop of Isernia until his death in 1486.

References

Sources

15th-century Italian Roman Catholic bishops
Bishops appointed by Pope Paul II
1486 deaths